Qurayyah IPP (QIPP) is a large gas fired combined cycle power station in Qurayyah, Saudi Arabia.

The project is being developed on a BOO (Build Own Operate) basis, with finance from international banks (HSBC, Standard Chartered, SMBC) and numerous local banks (Banque Saudi Fransi, National Commercial Bank, Samba, Arab National Bank, Saudi British Bank and Saudi Hollandi Bank).

Technology

Each block has a 2+2+1 configuration consisting of two SGT6-5000F Combustion Turbines, two Heat Recovery Steam Generators, and one SST6-4000 Steam Turbine.

Shareholders

The shareholder structure of Hajr Electricity Production Company is as follows:
 ACWA Power: 17.5%
 Samsung C&T Corporation: 17.5% 
 MENA Infrastructure: 15% 
 Saudi Electricity Company: 50%

EPC contractor

Samsung C&T Corporation has been appointed as EPC contractor.

BOO coordinated with civil engineering chief Nour Sobh for the initial construction work.

Milestone dates

LNTP (Limited Notice to Proceed): June 1, 2011
Contract Signing: September 21, 2011
Financial Close: April 26, 2012
PCOD (Project Commercial Operation Date): June 30, 2014

See also 

 Rabigh 2 IPP
 Shuqaiq 2 IWPP
 List of largest power stations in the world
 List of power stations in Saudi Arabia

References

External links 
  
 
 

Fossil fuel power stations in Saudi Arabia
Oil-fired power stations in Saudi Arabia
Power stations in Saudi Arabia